Robert Tilson Deane, 1st Baron Muskerry PC (Ire) (29 November 1745 – 25 June 1818), known as Sir Robert Deane, 6th Baronet from 1770 to 1781, was an Irish politician.

He was the son of Sir Robert Deane, 5th Baronet of Dromore and succeeded his father in the baronetcy in 1770.

Deane represented Carysfort in the Irish House of Commons between 1771 and 1776 and then Cork County between 1776 and 1781. He was also appointed High Sheriff of County Cork for 1773 and admitted to the Irish Privy Council in 1777. From 1780 to his death he was Custos Rotulorum of County Limerick.

In 1781 he was raised to the Peerage of Ireland as Baron Muskerry, in the County of Cork. In 1783, he was chosen Grandmaster of the Grand Lodge of Ireland, a post he held for the next both years.

Marriage and succession
Lord Muskerry married Anne, daughter of John FitzMaurice, in 1775 and later inherited Springfield Castle, County Limerick from his father-in-law. He died in June 1818, aged 72, and was succeeded in his titles by his eldest son John. Lady Muskerry died in 1830.

References

 Kidd, Charles, Williamson, David (editors). Debrett's Peerage and Baronetage (1990 edition). New York: St Martin's Press, 1990.
 

1745 births
1818 deaths
19th-century Irish people
Politicians from County Cork
Barons in the Peerage of Ireland
Peers of Ireland created by George III
Irish MPs 1769–1776
Irish MPs 1776–1783
Members of the Privy Council of Ireland
High Sheriffs of County Cork
Members of the Parliament of Ireland (pre-1801) for County Wicklow constituencies
Members of the Parliament of Ireland (pre-1801) for County Cork constituencies